The Loir is a river in France.

Loir may also refer to:
 Loir en Vallée, a commune in northwestern France
 Adrien Loir (1862–1941), French bacteriologist
 Caroline Loir (born 1988), French canoeist

Artists
 Luigi Loir (1845–1916), French painter, illustrator and lithographer, known for ceiling paintings and landscapes
 Marianne Loir (c.1715–1769), French portrait painter
 Nicolas-Pierre Loir (1624–1679), French painter and engraver of religious and historical allegories